The 22nd César Awards ceremony, presented by the Académie des Arts et Techniques du Cinéma, honoured the best French films of 1996 and took place on 8 February 1997 at the Théâtre des Champs-Élysées in Paris. The ceremony was chaired by Annie Girardot and hosted by Antoine de Caunes. Ridicule won the award for Best Film.

Winners and nominees

See also
 69th Academy Awards
 50th British Academy Film Awards
 9th European Film Awards
 2nd Lumières Awards

External links
 Official website
 
 22nd César Awards at AlloCiné

1997
1997 film awards
1997 in France